Wiesengrund railway station is a railway station in the municipality of Wängi, in the Swiss canton of Thurgau. It is located on the  Frauenfeld–Wil line of Appenzell Railways.

Services 
 the following services stop at Wiesengrund:

References

External links 
 
 

Railway stations in the canton of Thurgau
Appenzell Railways stations